Neighbours is an Australian television soap opera. It was first broadcast on 18 March 1985 and currently airs on digital channel Eleven. The following is a list of characters that appeared in the soap in 2015, by order of first appearance. All characters are introduced by the shows executive producer Jason Herbison. The 31st season of Neighbours began airing from 5 January 2015. Cat Rogers began appearing in the same month, while Michelle Kim, Tyler Brennan and Nick Petrides made their debuts in February. Jimmy Williams, Aaron Brennan and Mary Smith were introduced in June. Russell Brennan arrived during July and Courtney Grixti began appearing from August. September saw Piper Willis make her debut and Shay Daeng was introduced in October. Cecilia Saint was introduced in November.

Cat Rogers

Catriona "Cat" Rogers,  played by Maleeka Gasbarri, made her first screen appearance on 19 January 2015. The character's picture was previously seen in the episode broadcast on 28 November 2014, while Gasbarri's casting was announced on 15 January 2015. Gasbarri was cast in the month-long guest role after she was spotted by a Neighbours casting agent at an Australian Film and Television Academy course in Perth. Gasbarri filmed an audition tape in her home town of Dunsborough and sent it into them. She continued, "They said I had gotten the role and had to be there in two weeks to start filming. It was a bit overwhelming, but I was so excited."

Cat is Erin Rogers's (Adrienne Pickering) daughter. She was taken into care when her mother became addicted to drugs. Erin tells Sonya Mitchell (Eve Morey) that Cat does not want to see her, and they only communicate through Facebook. Sonya's husband, Toadfish Rebecchi (Ryan Moloney), sets up a meeting between Cat and Erin, but Cat pulls out at the last minute as she is too nervous. Cat asks for another meeting and turns up early. She bonds with Toadie over BMX bikes and talks with her mother. Cat leaves abruptly when she learns that Erin came to see her cricket matches, but did not speak with her. Erin writes Cat a letter and she returns to see Erin. They bond while playing cricket and when Erin asks Cat to stay a few days, she agrees. However, when Cat turns up she learns Erin has gone. Toadie and Sonya allow Cat to spend the night with them. Cat later asks Sonya and Toadie if she can live with them, as she does not want to stay with her foster parents, who she feels do not want her as they are expecting a baby. Sonya invites Cat's foster mother, Lorraine (Michelle Celebicanin), over to talk. Lorraine convinces Cat that she is wanted and Cat decides to return home. Before she goes, Sonya and Toadie tell her she can visit anytime.

Michelle Kim

Michelle Kim, played by Ra Chapman, made her first screen appearance on 6 February 2015. Chapman finished filming with Neighbours during the week beginning 18 April 2015. Michelle is an associate of "dodgy" businessman Dennis Dimato (David Serafin). Chapman compared Michelle to her role as Kim in prison drama Wentworth, saying she was more toned down, but just as "tough". She continued, "In Wentworth, my character takes the lead while in Neighbours, she is running an illegal car racket and is relentless in getting what she wants. Sometimes a bit scary." Chapman enjoyed playing Michelle, as she evolved to become "tougher and meaner".

When Matt Turner (Josef Brown) starts a new job as a security guard at Dimato Industries, he meets with Michelle, who tells him his duties. Michelle tries to befriend Matt and offers him a dress from surplus stock for his wife. She later calls her boss, Dennis Dimato, to tell him that getting Matt onside will not be hard. Matt quits his job after learning he is working for Dimato, but soon meets with Michelle to ask for it back as he needs the money. He later asks her for extra shifts. Michelle meets Tyler Brennan (Travis Burns) and gives him the details about his new job stripping stolen cars for parts. Michelle later congratulates Tyler for stealing items on a list given to him by Dimato, and she asks him to continue working for them. She exploits his strained relationship with his brother Mark (Scott McGregor) and convinces him to steal cars. When Tyler takes a car that is tracked by the police, Dimato is arrested. When he gets out on bail, he and Michelle buy Fitzgerald Motors to use as a cover for their business. Dimato flees the country and leaves Michelle in charge.

When Bailey Turner (Calen Mackenzie) takes one of the stolen cars, Michelle demands that Tyler steals a replacement or give her $8,000. After learning Paige Smith (Olympia Valance) reported the stolen car to the police, Michelle blackmails her into helping Tyler. He tries to persuade her to leave Paige out of it, but Michelle makes her the new garage assistant. A few days later, Michelle tells Paige that they have drop off some car parts. However, the police, having been tipped off, arrive and Michelle and Paige try to escape. Michelle trips and sprains her ankle, but Paige helps her. At the hospital, Michelle claims she tripped running for the bus. She accepts Paige's plan to run the garage as a legit business. Dimato later returns to town and reunites with Michelle and their group. Tyler tries to run and Michelle suspects he is spying for the police. When the police eventually arrive, Michelle tries to escape, but Paige trips her up with a dustbin and she is arrested.

A few months later, Michelle is released and she asks Mark for help as Dimato is out for revenge against her, Tyler and Paige. Michelle later turns up at Number 24 and tells Paige that she does not feel safe at the caravan park, where the police have hidden her. They bond over family problems and stay in touch via text messages. Michelle asks Paige to meet her, which results in Paige being knocked out and put in a car boot. Michelle later turns up at Paige's house, claiming that Dimato found her and attacked her. Paige lets her stay the night and tries to help, unaware that Michelle is using make-up to fake her bruises, so she can trick Paige into thinking Dimato is after her, as part of a plan to set Paige up for burglary. Dimato later punches Michelle for real during an argument, but despite this she continues with the plan. After renting an apartment in her name for Michelle, Paige discovers the truth when she finds a large number of stolen items in the apartment, and Michelle tips off the police. Paige manages to remove the items before the police arrive, while Paul Robinson (Stefan Dennis) blackmails Dimato into leaving town, after which Michelle also abandons Erinsborough.

Tyler Brennan

Tyler Brennan, played by Travis Burns, made his first screen appearance on 6 February 2015. The character and casting was announced on 3 November 2014. Burns was asked to audition for the part while he was in the United States earlier in the year. Of his casting, he said "When you score a role on a show as iconic as Neighbours, you don't say no. It's especially cool to be joining the show in its 30th-anniversary year. I feel like I've arrived at the perfect time." Tyler is the younger brother of established character Mark Brennan (Scott McGregor). Burns felt an instant connection with McGregor, as they had previously met a few times through their modelling agency, which he felt helped him secure the role. Tyler is a mechanic and was billed as a "badboy-with-a-heart". Melissa Field from TV Week Soap Extra also called him "troublesome" and a "ladies' man".

Nick Petrides

Nick Petrides, played by Damien Fotiou, made his first screen appearance on 19 February 2015. The character and casting was revealed on 20 November 2014, when Fotiou was seen in a behind the scenes video released by Neighbours on their YouTube channel. Nick is Terese Willis' (Rebekah Elmaloglou) brother, who comes to Erinsborough to visit his family. Fotiou said Nick is an oncologist, but he reassured fans that he was not being introduced as part of any health storylines. The actor explained, "It's all about just coming home I think. He just wants to come home." Nick befriended Georgia Brooks (Saskia Hampele), causing her husband, Kyle Canning (Chris Milligan), to dislike him. Fotiou later described Nick: "He is a very interesting character. His intentions are certainly noble, however all is not what it appears and I love the way the story unfolds – there's a lot of surprises." Fotiou had to undergo a small makeover for the part, which involved having his curly hair slicked back to create "a more conservative appearance."

An Inside Soap columnist thought Nick's fake-cancer plot was "dastardly" and added, "we didn't think there were many people around who are more wicked than Paul Robinson – but it seems he's well and truly met his match in Doctor Nick." Louise Rugendyke of The Sydney Morning Herald observed that Nick "seems to be as competent as Dr. Nick on The Simpsons". Daniel Kilkelly of Digital Spy branded Nick "one of the show's most twisted villains". Fotiou reprised his role in 2017 when Nick was reintroduced for Terese's breast cancer storyline. He  returned on 31 July.

Nick comes to Erinsborough for an interview at the local hospital with Karl Kennedy (Alan Fletcher). While he is at The Waterhole, Karl introduces Nick to nurse Georgia Brooks. She attempts to tell him about working at the hospital, but he cuts her off as he is trying to send an email. Nick catches up with his sister, Terese, and stays for lunch with her family. Terese's husband, Brad (Kip Gamblin) is uneasy about Nick's arrival and later tells Terese that Nick engineered a meeting between Brad, his former wife and son before their wedding. Terese confronts Nick, who admits that he wanted to see if Brad was faithful to her. Nick befriends Paul Robinson (Stefan Dennis) and decides to accept the job at the hospital. During a function at Paul's penthouse, Chris Pappas (James Mason) chokes on some food and Georgia saves his life. When Nick questions Georgia as to why she did call for his help, she calls him arrogant. Nick makes a bet with Paul that he can have sex with Georgia, even though she is married. Nick gets closer to Georgia when he asks for her help with fundraising ideas. He gives her tickets to the ballet as a gesture of thanks and accompanies her when her husband is busy with work. Nick later asks Georgia to a conference in Hobart, but Georgia overhears him talking about the bet with Paul. He tries to pass it off as a joke, but Georgia pours her drink over him, causing Nick's stutter to return. Paul angers Nick when he informs him that his application for a cancer research centre has been denied. Nick doctors Paul's blood test results and tells Paul that he has leukaemia. Nick begins Paul on a course of chemotherapy.

Paul tells Nick that he is willing to back his plans for the treatment centre, after the sale of the site does not go through. Nick tries apologising to Georgia again, but she makes a complaint against him. She is suspended from work after she accuses Nick of framing her by hacking into her social media page to reveal a patient's details. When Nick learns the decision about the research centre has been delayed, he tells Paul that his body has stopped responding to the chemotherapy. Paul later informs Nick that the cancer centre has the go-ahead. Nick finds Georgia in his hotel room and believes she has been going through his computer. She is arrested and later fired from the hospital. Paul collapses at The Waterhole and Nick is prevented from treating him in private. Georgia confronts Nick and claims that he has faked Paul's illness. Georgia takes the evidence to Mark Brennan (Scott McGregor), who questions both Nick and Paul. Nick is suspended when IT find out that he deleted Paul's patient files. He confesses what he did to Terese, claiming his motivation was to find a cure for cancer. He then attempts to flee Erinsborough, but Brad calls the police and Nick is arrested. Paul asks to see him and tells him that the research centre will be shut down and he will see to it that Nick loses his medical license. At the station, Nick belittles his family, before he is led away.

Two years later, Terese's fiancé Gary Canning (Damien Richardson) visits Nick in prison. He tells Nick that Terese has been diagnosed with breast cancer and that her current treatment is not working, before asking him for his help. Terese also visits Nick and he recommends immunotherapy, but tells her he has to get out of prison in order to help. Terese agrees to talk at his parole hearing, while Clive Gibbons (Geoff Paine), the hospital's COO writes a letter of recommendation. Paul also comes to see Nick to let him know that he will do everything he can to stop his release. However, Nick is paroled under the condition that does not practice medicine, but he can continue his research and oversee Terese's treatment. Nick is reacquainted with his niece Piper Willis (Mavournee Hazel), while David Tanaka (Takaya Honda) is assigned to oversee Nick's work. While attending church, Nick helps Amy Williams (Zoe Cramond) when she sprains her ankle. Nick soon learns Amy is Paul's daughter and attempts to speak to her, but Leo Tanaka (Tim Kano) tells him to stay away. The West Waratah Star publishes an article about Nick's employment at the hospital and the hospital board threatens to reverse the decision to let Nick consult on Terese's treatment. A further article painting Nick in a more favourable light is later published.

Gary overhears Nick on the phone admitting to keeping something from Terese, before putting a file in his briefcase. Amy invites Nick to the penthouse for a drink. He later realises she has taken his file. Amy refuses to hand it over until he tells her the truth. Nick says he wants to help Terese and attempts to take the file from Amy, who hits him with a vase. Amy learns that Nick wants to open a wellness centre for cancer patients, and she apologises to him. They later spend the night together, and she comforts him when a young patient dies. Stephanie Scully (Carla Bonner) offers up Robinsons Motel as the location for the wellness centre. Paul tries to write Nick a cheque for any amount, as long as Nick leaves town and opens his wellness centre in Perth, but Nick refuses the money. As Nick is spending time with Amy and Terese, Mark Brennan comes to search his room after receiving a tip off that Nick has taken cancer drugs from the hospital. Mark finds the drugs and Nick accuses Paul of planting them. A patient comes to Nick's hotel room claiming that Nick texted her to pick up the drugs. Mark finds the sent text on Nick's phone and takes him to the station, where his parole is revoked. Paul reveals he planted the drugs, but Nick is kept in prison after he assaults a guard. Paul's actions push Amy away from him. Consequently, Paul pays a top barrister a few months later to represent Nick in court. Terese is told off screen by Nick that he plans on heading back to Darwin to see family.

Jimmy Williams

Jimmy Williams, played by Darcy Tadich, made his first screen appearance on 10 June 2015. The character and Tadich's casting details were announced on 17 May 2015. The role marks Tadich's television acting debut. Tadich found the audition process "nerve wracking", but he decided to use his nervous energy during his performance. He found out he won the role of Jimmy after only one audition. Jimmy is the young son of returning character Amy Williams (Zoe Cramond) and the first grandchild of established regular Paul Robinson (Stefan Dennis). Paul is unaware of Jimmy's existence due to his estrangement from Amy, but is "overjoyed" to learn that he has a grandson. Jimmy and Paul get along well, but Amy is aware of how "impressionable" Jimmy is and becomes concerned that Paul might overindulge him. Tadich called Jimmy a "happy-go-lucky" kid, who is into video games. Tadich departed the show on 25 May 2018, as Jimmy leaves for New York City with his father. He reprised the role the following year, and returned on 22 May 2019. Tadich later reprised the role for Cramond's exit, which aired on 1 January 2020.

After Amy's cousin Daniel Robinson (Tim Phillipps) asks her to return to Erinsborough to reconnect with Paul, she agrees for Jimmy's sake. Jimmy meets his grandfather for the first time and enjoys his stories of an old well nearby. He later disappears from Sonya Rebecchi's (Eve Morey) garden and Amy suspects he has gone down the well. However, Jimmy goes to The Waterhole looking for Paul and he bonds with Naomi Canning (Morgana O'Reilly), Paul's assistant. Amy allows Paul to look after Jimmy while she is working for Kyle Canning (Chris Milligan). Paul connects with Jimmy and buys him expensive presents, which Amy later returns to him, having previously mentioned that Jimmy could not have them until Christmas. When Jimmy struggles with his science project, he calls Paul for help. Amy returns home to find them working together and is impressed that Paul did not need to spend money on Jimmy to help them bond. Jimmy finds a bag of letters that contain the secrets of the residents of Ramsay Street. He reads a couple and blackmails Karl Kennedy (Alan Fletcher) into giving him a cake. He later tries the same thing with Karl's wife Susan (Jackie Woodburne), but she marches him home to Sonya, who then tells Amy. Jimmy is reprimanded, but when he finds Sheila Canning's (Colette Mann) secret, he blackmails her into giving him crisps and cake. When Sheila cannot cope with the pressure, she shakes Jimmy. His cries attract Amy's attention and Sheila admits that he has been blackmailing her. Jimmy and Sheila later apologise to each other.

Jimmy befriends Kyle and spends a lot of his time at the Dial-a-Kyle builders yard. Amy and Kyle develop feelings for each other, but their potential romance is halted when Jimmy's father Liam Barnett (James Beck) visits. Jimmy and Liam spend time together. Amy allows Jimmy to walk to a Dial-a-Kyle, but he goes missing. Stephanie Scully (Carla Bonner) finds him hiding out at the high school and he is reunited with Amy. He later witnesses his father accepting a bribe from Paul never to contact him or Amy again, after which Jimmy becomes distant from Paul. Amy and Jimmy move in with Kyle and Sheila. Jimmy initially dislikes Kyle taking the place of Liam, until he is told of his father's crimes. Jimmy befriends Steph's son Charlie Hoyland (Alexander McGuire) when he comes to stay. When Paul goes on the run, after being accused of causing an explosion at Lassiter's Hotel, Jimmy finds him and warns him that the police are on their way. Jimmy follows Paul into the bush and is stung by a bee, which causes him to suffer an allergic reaction. Paul takes him to Erinsborough Hospital and is arrested. Jimmy struggles with Paul's imprisonment. He challenges Charlie to a series of dares. When Steph has to work, Mark Brennan (Scott McGregor) takes the boys on a tour around the Erinsborough Police Station. Jimmy steals some pepper spray and sprays the can at Charlie as part of a dare. Charlie requires medical treatment at the hospital. When Amy confronts him, Jimmy admits that he is just trying to have fun, as he has been abandoned by his father, grandfather and Kyle, who left to reunite with his wife. While Jimmy and Charlie are playing with a drone, they lose control of it and Jimmy gets on his bike to catch up to it. He is struck by a car and the driver leaves the scene. Jimmy is rushed to the hospital, where he has to undergo surgery to remove a ruptured spleen. Kyle returns for a visit and Amy decides to move out, causing Jimmy to blame Kyle for not being able to live at Number 26 anymore. Sheila convinces them to stay, but months later Amy and Jimmy move in with Paul at the Lassiter's penthouse.

Jimmy crashes his drone and believes that he caused Steph to crash her bike, but when he reports it to the police, he is informed that a broken muffler caused Steph's accident. After Jimmy has a check-up at the hospital, he and Amy meet Nick Petrides (Damien Fotiou), who asks Jimmy if he would play chess with a patient of his. Jimmy initially refuses, as he dislikes Nick due to history with Paul, but later changes his mind and bonds with Nick. While riding his bike through the Lassiter's complex, Jimmy realises he is going to hit Kirsha Rebecchi (Vani Dhir) and shouts at her to get out of the way, but as she cannot hear, her father Shane Rebecchi (Nicholas Coghlan) pushes her aside and Jimmy hits him with his bike instead, resulting in Shane injuring his hand. Jimmy decides to buy Kirsha a smart watch so she can access her talk to text app more easily, but he has no money. Tia Martinez (Erica Brown) suggests that he steals alcohol from the hotel rooms, as her brother would buy it. Jimmy later takes several bottles from Xanthe Canning's (Lilly Van der Meer) housekeeping cart and sells them to Gus Martinez (Blake Draper). Tia later plants some of the alcohol bottles in Xanthe's school bag out of revenge. After Xanthe is suspended from school and the hotel, Jimmy admits that he stole the bottles. Jimmy develops a crush on Poppy Ryan (Eloise Ross), but struggles to talk to her, so Kirsha helps him to ask Poppy out on a date. Jimmy and Poppy soon begin dating. Jimmy's father Liam returns to Erinsborough and attempts to repair his relationship with his son. Jimmy decides to walk home from school when he feels ill, but due to his weakened immune system, he collapses. Liam finds him and rushes him to the hospital, where he recovers. Kirsha tells Jimmy that Poppy has been bullying her, so he asks Poppy to stop and then breaks up with her. Jimmy learns that Liam is leaving town again and he believes it may be his fault. Amy eventually tells him that Liam has a job offer in New York City and wanted Jimmy to go with him, but she asked him to leave instead. Jimmy assures his mother that he would never have left with Liam, but he later tells Kirsha that it would be cool to go to New York. Paul later asks Jimmy whether he wants to go and Jimmy tells him that he does, as it is only for six months. Amy gives Jimmy her blessing to go, and Paul accompanies Jimmy and Liam to New York to help him settle in.

The following year, Amy's partner Gary Canning (Damien Richardson) flies Jimmy over to Erinsborough for her birthday party, and their surprise wedding. After Amy refuses to marry Gary at the party, she and Jimmy go away for a few days. On their return, Paul tries to convince Jimmy that Amy was happier with Kyle, but he says it is Amy's decision. Jimmy has dinner with Paul, Terese Willis (Rebekah Elmaloglou), Gary and Amy before he leaves for the airport. Months later, Amy learns that Jimmy has been going through a difficult teenage phase. Jimmy returns to Erinsborough, after Liam informs Leo that he is missing. Amy tries talking with him and Jimmy explains that he and Liam have been arguing for a few months. Amy also learns from Liam that Jimmy has been spending time with some friends that Liam disapproves of, so she confronts him about his behaviour. Jimmy later steals some money from Amy's purse. Amy discovers Jimmy has brought his girlfriend to Australia with him, and is hiding her from her abusive father. Jimmy begs Amy to move to New York with him as he misses her support. With her reconciliation with Kyle already on the rocks, Amy decides to break off their relationship and leave Erinsborough with Jimmy and Leo.

Aaron Brennan

Aaron Brennan, played by Matt Wilson, made his first screen appearance on 16 June 2015. The character and casting was announced on 17 May 2015. Wilson relocated from Sydney to Melbourne for filming. Aaron is the third member of the Brennan family to be introduced, after his older and younger brothers Mark (Scott McGregor) and Tyler Brennan (Travis Burns). Wilson said Aaron was "a very confident young guy", who likes to make people happy and is unfazed by many things. Aaron made "a memorable entrance" as a male stripper, before he tried to reconnect with his brothers. Aaron is also gay and Matt Bamford from The Daily Telegraph reported that he could be a love interest for Nate Kinski (Meyne Wyatt). Anthony D. Langford from TheBacklot.com was surprised that one of the Brennan brothers was gay and hoped Wilson had been cast for more than his looks.

Mary Smith

Mary Smith, played by Gina Liano, made first screen appearance on 30 June 2015. Liano's casting was announced on 6 April 2015 and the role marks her acting debut. Luke Dennehy of the Herald Sun reported that the casting directors hired Liano after she impressed them with a screen test. Liano began filming with the show on 14 April. Of her casting, Liano said "I'm thrilled, I think it will be a lot of fun. It's a new experience, I love a challenge and I'm really looking forward to working with Olympia and the rest of the crew down there on the Neighbours set." Mary is Paige Smith's (Olympia Valance) adoptive mother. Valance believed Liano was the ideal person to play Mary, commenting "She's exactly what I imagine Paige's mum would be." Liano's look and style was not changed for the part and she said that it was one of the reasons she was chosen to play Mary. Mary returned in February 2016.

Mary comes to Erinsborough for her adopted daughter Paige's 21st birthday. She also meets Paige's biological parents Lauren (Kate Kendall) and Brad (Kip Gamblin). Mary apologises to Paige for turning up unannounced and reveals that her son Ethan (Matt Little) has been keeping her up to date with Paige's business. Terese Willis (Rebekah Elmaloglou) later visits Mary and learns that she wants Paige to come to Singapore with her. During a meeting, Paige tells Mary that she once overheard her say the minute she arrived was the minute everything went wrong. Mary does not deny saying it, but explains that she had learned that Paige had been stolen and that her husband had lied to her, which eventually ruined their marriage. Lauren asks Mary to stay longer to show Paige that she cares. Terese encourages Mary to use Lassiter's Hotel for a business event. Mary asks that Naomi Canning (Morgana O'Reilly) is not involved due to her prior connection with a client. Mary and Paige bond over a crafting event at Off Air, and Paige accepts Mary's invitation to Singapore. She later changes her mind due to her involvement in a police investigation. Before she leaves, Mary tells Paige that she is proud of her. She also mentions that Terese seemed pretty keen for Paige to go to Singapore. Mary tells Paige she cannot come to her wedding to Mark Brennan (Scott McGregor), but sends her a glamorous wedding dress as a present. As a surprise, Mary does arrive, but finds the wedding called off as Mark arrested Paige at the ceremony. Mary comforts her daughter and tries to convince Mark to talk to Paige, but he refuses. Seeing how upset she is, Mary then convinces Paige to come back to Singapore with her.

Russell Brennan

Russell Brennan, played by Russell Kiefel, made his first screen appearance on 29 July 2015. The character and casting was announced on 29 June 2015. Russell is the father of Mark (Scott McGregor), Tyler (Travis Burns) and Aaron Brennan (Matt Wilson). The family will be at the centre of "a controversial" domestic violence storyline. Russell abused his sons and later became estranged from them, so they are wary when he tries to convince them he has changed. Of the character, Kiefel said "He has a lot of ground to make up with his boys and the challenge is to convince them that he is a changed man... but is he?" Claire Crick of All About Soap observed, "while he might not be as easy on the eye as his hunky sons, he's certainly set to cause a stir in his new neighbourhood!" Producers planned for Kiefel to reprise his role as part of a major storyline for the Brennan family, but it had to be rewritten following his death in November 2016. The Brennan brothers' mother Fay (Zoe Bertram) was introduced instead.

After his eldest son Mark contacts him to catch-up, Russell comes to Ramsay Street to see his sons. He remarks to Aaron that it is the first time in a while that they have all been together. Aaron makes a quick exit, while Tyler tries to avoid his father. Russell meets Mark's girlfriend Paige Smith (Olympia Valance) and Sheila Canning (Colette Mann), who he later flirts with. Russell learns Aaron is an exotic dancer and admits to Nate Kinski (Meyne Wyatt) that he finds it hard to relate to his son. At home, Russell tries talking to Aaron about his job and Aaron asks if he wants to watch the football with him. Russell continues to bond with his sons and they arrange a barbecue, which Russell invites Tyler to. He apologises for beating him when he was younger.

Russell and Sheila begin dating. She offers to help him buy Fitzgerald Motors, as he is unable to get a quick sale for his current garage in Port Lincoln. However, Mark finds out the money was illegally obtained by Sheila's son, Gary Canning (Damien Richardson), so she hands it into the police instead. Mark and Aaron offer to help buy the garage with their savings. Tyler and Russell spend the day with Ben Kirk (Felix Mallard), who they play practical jokes on. Russell loses his temper when Ben pulls down his shorts and Karl Kennedy (Alan Fletcher) stops him from hitting Ben. Tyler is reminded of the past and begins acting up again. Russell challenges him on his behaviour and nearly hits him, but Tyler retaliates by punching him. When Mark finds out, he confronts Tyler, who reveals Russell's years of abuse. Russell confirms this to Mark and Aaron and they tell him to leave. He asks Sheila to come with him, but she refuses, telling him he needs to get help. They say goodbye, as his three sons look on.

Two years later, Russell suffers a massive heart attack and asks his former wife Fay Brennan (Zoe Bertram) to visit him. Shortly before his sons and Sheila are due to fly up to see him, Russell dies. It later becomes apparent that Hamish Roche (Sean Taylor) is Tyler's biological father rather than Russell, who was murdered by Hamish and his girlfriend, nurse Louise McLeod (Maria Theodorakis).

Courtney Grixti

Courtney Grixti, played by Emma Lane, made her first screen appearance on 4 August 2015. Lane is in a relationship with Travis Burns, who plays Tyler Brennan, and commented "I was over the moon when I got the news but I think Travis was more excited than me. He is a very supportive boy." Lane admitted to being nervous about portraying a romance with Harley Bonner on-screen, as they are friends in real life. Following her initial guest stint, Burns posted photos on his social media accounts showing Lane had returned to filming. She made her on-screen return on 4 February 2016.

Courtney is a barmaid at The Waterhole who attends a staff meeting. She questions the cost of soft drinks when Terese Willis (Rebekah Elmaloglou) implements a new food and drinks policy for the staff, and then makes a comment about Terese's managerial privilege behind her back. Courtney meets Terese's son Josh (Bonner) and they have sex. He makes it clear that he wants to see her again, and they decide to go camping together. At the camp site, Courtney meets Josh's sisters Imogen Willis (Ariel Kaplan) and Paige Smith (Olympia Valance), and his pregnant ex-girlfriend Amber Turner (Jenna Rosenow). Courtney uses her body language reading skills to work out whether Aaron Brennan (Matt Wilson) is interested in her boss Nate Kinski (Meyne Wyatt), and she bonds with Amber. When Josh reveals that he has moved out of his house, he asks Courtney if he can stay with her, but she turns him down and then breaks up with him. Courtney begins dating Tyler Brennan (Travis Burns), causing Piper Willis (Mavournee Hazel) to become jealous of her. Piper later films Courtney arguing and then hugging the much older mayoral candidate, Tim Collins (Ben Anderson), thinking that they are having an affair. She publishes the film to smear Tim, but soon learns that Courtney is in fact Tim's daughter. Courtney is initially outraged by Piper's actions, but after Piper reveals that Tim intends to sue her, and that she is in love with Tyler, Courtney ultimately defuses the situation, convincing her father to drop the lawsuit.

Disgusted when Tim tries to publicly humiliate Sonya, Courtney vandalises his car. She moves in with Tyler to get away from her father, but he becomes tired of her trying to run his life, and they break up. Courtney supports Paige after her relationship with Tyler's brother ends. They go out to a club together to show that they are moving on, and Courtney sets Paige up on a date with their older university lecturer, Noel Creighton (Kristian Beddow). Months later, Courtney and Paige are at The Waterhole when Tyler walks in. Courtney decides that she wants to get back together with him and convinces Paige to host a house party. Courtney flirts with Tyler at the party, but he is not interested and she leaves with Elly Conway (Jodi Anasta). Months later, Courtney comes to Paige's birthday party, and reveals that she has quit university. Terese gives Courtney a job at Lassiter's Hotel spa. Courtney receives large tips from male clients and sends Xanthe away during sessions. Sheila suspects that Courtney is illegally administering botox, so Karl Kennedy (Alan Fletcher) confronts her. Courtney tells him that she has designed a tailored service for some of her male clients and she offers them privacy while it happens. She treats Karl and he makes return visits, along with Shane Rebecchi (Nicholas Coghlan), leading to further suspicion from their wives Susan (Jackie Woodburne) and Dipi (Sharon Johal). Terese later investigates Courtney and accuses her of giving the male clients a happy ending, which is broadcast to those inside The Waterhole by a microphone Courtney is wearing. Terese fires Courtney, but soon learns that she was using her psychology skills to offer massages and emotional therapy, which often made the male clients cry. Terese apologises and attempts to offer Courtney her job back, but Courtney quits. Susan and Dipi also offer their apologies. Courtney soon realises that Tim believed the rumours too. She decides to leave the country for a while, and later sues Terese for $5 million. A few weeks later, Courtney returns to Erinsborough engaged to Paul Robinson (Stefan Dennis).

Paul convinces Courtney to drop the lawsuit against Terese, as he is now the biggest investor in the hotel, which means Terese has to answer to him and Courtney, who Paul hires as a Rejuvenation Consultant. Paul and Courtney inform his children of their engagement and Amy Williams (Zoe Cramond) suspects Courtney is after Paul's money. Tim tries to get Courtney to come home, but she refuses. Paul's son Leo Tanaka (Tim Kano) helps Courtney give a speech to the judges of the Most Liveable Suburb Competition. After thanking him for his help, she tells him he is welcome to stay the night. Courtney apologises, telling him that she is naturally flirty, but she is committed to Paul. Leo later attempts to kiss Courtney, but she pushes him away. She decides not to tell Paul, as she does not want to hurt him. Paul soon admits that he and Courtney are not in a relationship, and that they just wanted to get revenge on Terese and Tim. Courtney hosts a silent disco at The Waterhole, but it does not attract much attention. Paul saves the event by turning it into a tea dance for his cousin Hilary Robinson (Anne Scott-Pendlebury) and her friends. After dancing together, Courtney tells Paul that they should make their relationship real, but Paul is hesitant. He later suggests to Courtney that they elope. Tim accosts Courtney outside Lassiter's, where she tells him that she and Paul are married. She then tells Amy, Leo and their friends. However, it emerges that they did not go through with the ceremony. Courtney begins packing up her belongings to move out of the penthouse, but she remarks that she has nowhere to go. Paul tells Tim the truth and brings him back to the penthouse to speak with Courtney. Tim tells her that he cares for her and apologises for pushing her too hard. He asks her to return home and she agrees. Courtney gives Paul her resignation from Lassiter's and he tells her to keep the engagement and wedding rings.

Piper Willis

Piper Willis, played by Mavournee Hazel, made her first screen appearance on 16 September 2015. The character has often been mentioned since the arrival of her on-screen family in May 2013, while Hazel's casting was announced on 18 August 2015. The actress relocated to Melbourne for filming and commented "It's a great feeling to be rewarded with the role of Piper after years of hard work, especially when I fell in love with the character after my first audition." Ahead of her first appearance, the character was featured in a series of webisodes titled Hey Piper, which see her talking to her family via online video calls. Piper is the youngest daughter of Brad (Kip Gamblin) and Terese Willis (Rebekah Elmaloglou). She has been away studying in Canada. Hazel stated that she and the producers had a similar idea of how they wanted the character to be, and she was billed as being "feisty" and "quirky".

Shay Daeng

Shay Daeng (also Quill), played by Yasmin Kassim, made her first screen appearance on 29 October 2015. The character and Kassim's casting was announced on 25 October 2015. Kassim told Jonathon Moran of The Daily Telegraph that she filmed her guest stint over "a couple of months" in Melbourne. She described her character as being "really cool" and explained that Shay comes to Erinsborough to work at Lassiter's Hotel. Kassim added that Shay would endure drama in her personal and work lives and would have secrets. Kassim reprised the role in 2021.

Shay connects with Kyle Canning (Chris Milligan) on a dating app and they meet for a drink at The Waterhole. Kyle later invites Shay back to his house. Kyle later introduces Shay to his grandmother Sheila Canning (Colette Mann) and his colleague Amy Williams (Zoe Cramond). Shay reveals that she has been brought in as the assistant manager of Lassiter's Hotel, while Terese Willis (Rebekah Elmaloglou) recovers from injuries sustained in a fire. Terese later praises Shay for her work at Lassiter's and questions where she has seen Shay before. Shay confronts Kyle about breaking up with her via text message, and she threatens him and Amy. She later looks at a photo of herself as a young girl with Terese in Perth. Terese asks Shay about her CV, causing Shay to call someone to let them know Terese is suspicious of her. After entering Terese's home, Shay photos the Lassiter's staff personnel files. Terese catches her and demands to look in her bag to check she did not take anything. She then sees the photo of herself and Shay. Terese later realises that she met Shay at a Lassiter's conference with her step-mother, Julie Quill (Gail Easdale), fifteen years ago. Shay reveals that she has been spying for the Quill Group and they now own Lassiter's. She then asks Paul Robinson (Stefan Dennis) to vacate the premises immediately. Shay oversees the restructuring of the hotel and keeps Terese on as manager. She gets her revenge on Kyle by cancelling his contract with Lassiter's and bad-mouthing his business. Amy smears manure on Shay in retaliation. Shay then leaves for Dubai.

Five years later, Shay meets with Jesse Porter (Cameron Robbie), a Lassiter's employee who has been spying for the Quill Group. He gives her a report about a drive-in movie night idea that Lassiter's has had. When Shay demands information about budgets and contracts, Jesse tells her that Paul and Terese already know the Quill Group stole their film festival pitch, and they will eventually figure out that he was behind it. Shay tells Jesse that she knew what to look for when she worked for Terese, so he should not be telling her it cannot be done. She then asks if he would say that to Julie and Jesse tells her that he will work it out. It soon emerges that Jesse is Julie's son and he is trying to help Shay repair the Quill Group's damaged reputation. Shay demands Jesse finds more information and says that he is not doing enough. She tells him that the Quill Group is still suffering due to Julie's actions. Jesse argues that Paul was also a victim of Julie's crimes, but Shay says that he was not. She threatens to kick Jesse out of the business if he does not help. After discovering the truth about Jesse's connection to Julie and the Quill Group, Terese confronts Shay and tells her not to punish Jesse because of his mother's actions. Shay accuses Terese of loving the fact that the Quill Group is folding. Terese says that cutting Jesse out will ruin his life. Terese later tells Shay that she is interested in having Lassiters invest in the Quill Group to save the business. However, Terese informs Shay that the investment will have to be postponed indefinitely, as Paul has some personal matters to sort out. Shay reminds Terese that the company is close to folding and she will now be forced to source another financier who can help them out.

Cecilia Saint

Cecilia Saint, played by Candice Alley, made her first screen appearance on 11 November 2015. The character and Alley's casting was announced on the same day. Alley auditioned for the role and learned she had been successful a couple of days later. She commented that the cast and crew had been very welcoming towards her. Of joining the show, the singer said "With such a love for acting, I feel so fortunate to be part of such an iconic Australian series and working with such an amazing team of people." Alley filmed her first scenes in August, and returned to the set in 2016 to continue her character's storyline. Cecilia was billed as "a mysterious woman" who becomes involved in a scheme to unhinge Stephanie Scully (Carla Bonner). Alley told a New Idea reporter that she enjoyed "being able to delve into a character who's also a single mother."

Cecilia brings her car to Fitzgerald Motors for a service. She also asks Steph to replace the brake pads. Cecilia also brings her son Harrison (Zebedee Howell) along and calls him Charlie in front of Steph. When Cecilia returns, she gets angry, claiming she did not ask for new brake pads, and Steph's boss Tyler Brennan (Travis Burns) refunds her, despite Steph telling him she did. Afterwards, Cecilia calls Paul Robinson (Stefan Dennis) to tell him that she has followed his instructions and unnerved Steph. Cecilia later has Harrison call Steph to tell her that he is missing her. Months later, Paul contacts Cecilia and pays her to ruin the Citizen of the Year event at Lassiter's Hotel. After the hotel is destroyed by an explosion, Paul tries to contact Cecilia to find out if she caused it, but she ignores his calls. Following Paul's arrest, Steph confronts Cecilia about Paul's instructions. Cecilia tells her that she had to take her son to the hospital at the time of the explosion. When Steph asks her to go to the police, Cecilia refuses and says she will deny any involvement if anyone asks. Cecilia turns up at Terese Willis's (Rebekah Elmaloglou) house looking for her daughter Piper (Mavournee Hazel), who uploaded an interview with Paul in which Cecilia was mentioned. Terese asks Cecilia if she thinks Paul is guilty and when Cecilia says that she does, Terese pays her to go to the police and implicate Paul in the explosion. Terese also offers her a job. During the trial, Cecilia gives her false testimony. But Terese feels guilty at what she has done and tells the court that she paid Cecilia to lie.

Others

References

External links
 Characters and cast at the Official AU Neighbours website
 Characters and cast at the Official UK Neighbours website
 Characters and cast at the Internet Movie Database

2015
Neighbours